Cloontuskert is a village, townland and civil parish in County Roscommon, Ireland. Known as "Clontuskert" for census purposes, the population was 171 at the 2016 census. The village mainly developed, beginning in 1953, as housing for Bord na Móna employees working on the surrounding boglands.

Notable people
Anne McLoughlin (born c. 1960), Irish aid worker and hostage

References

Towns and villages in County Roscommon
Townlands of County Roscommon
Civil parishes of County Roscommon